São Joaquim National Park is a National park in the state of Santa Catarina, Brazil.

Location

The park is in the Atlantic Forest biome.
It was established by decree on 6 July 1961, and is administered by the Chico Mendes Institute for Biodiversity Conservation.
It covers parts of the municipalities of Urubici, Orleans, Grão Pará and Bom Jardim da Serra in Santa Catarina.
It was originally set aside to preserve exceptional remnant forests of the Paraná pine, Araucaria angustifolia.
It is now also popular for alpinism.
The park adjoins the  Serra Furada State Park, created in 1980.

The terrain is very rugged and includes canyons, large caves and slopes covered in native forest.
The park is the source of the main rivers of the state, holding the basins of the Canoas River, Tubarão River and Pelotas River.
The cold climate does not support a large amount of wildlife, but there are several endangered species living in and around the park.

Conservation

The park is classified as IUCN protected area category II (national park). It has the objectives of preserving natural ecosystems of great ecological relevance and scenic beauty, enabling scientific research, environmental education, outdoors recreation and eco-tourism.
The park is intended to preserve the Araucária Forest, alpine meadows and cloud forests.
Protected species in the park include maned wolf (Chrysocyon brachyurus), cougar (Puma concolor), red-spectacled amazon (Amazona pretrei) and Chaco eagle (Buteogallus coronatus).

Notes

Sources

1961 establishments in Brazil
National parks of Brazil
Protected areas of Santa Catarina (state)
Urubici
Protected areas of the Atlantic Forest